No Jin-hyuk (Hangul: 노진혁, Hanja: 盧珍赫; born July 15, 1989 in Gwangju, South Korea) is a South Korean shortstop for the NC Dinos in the Korea Baseball Organization. He bats left-handed and throws right-handed.

Amateur career 
As a five-tool player No was a fixture in the starting lineup beginning his freshman year at Sungkyunkwan University. Although he primarily played as a shortstop, No was utilized at third base and first base as well. As an amateur player No was selected for the South Korea national baseball team and competed in the Baseball World Cup twice in 2009 and 2011.

Notable international careers

Professional career 
No was selected 21st overall by the NC Dinos in the 2012 KBO Draft. Although No batted a disappointing .194 with 2 home runs and 25 RBI in the 2012 Futures League, he became the Dinos' starting shortstop showing great defensive skills.

The Dinos' starting shortstop for the 2013 season was 2007 KBO batting champion Lee Hyun-gon who was traded from the Kia Tigers as a free agent. However, he was replaced by No early on, who showed better offensive and defensive stats as a backup shortstop. On April 27, 2013, No hit his first KBO league home run, which was an inside the park, against starting pitcher Kim Sun-woo of the Doosan Bears.

In 2014, the Dinos signed free-agent shortstop Son Si-hyun from the Doosan Bears and moved No back to the bench. After spending two mediocre seasons, No left the Dinos for another two seasons to serve mandatory military service.

As Son's both offensive and defensive skills deteriorated significantly, No became starting shortstop for the Dinos in the 2018 season when he played 125 games and batted .283, 42 runs batted in (RBI), 21 doubles and 11 home runs. The next season, he finished third on the team with 13 home runs, a .264 batting average, 43 RBIs and 23 doubles in 110 games.

External links 
 
Career statistics and player information from Korea Baseball Organization 

NC Dinos players
Sungkyunkwan University alumni
1989 births
Living people
South Korean baseball players
Sportspeople from Gwangju
Gwangsan No clan